The Debt is a short film produced and directed by Mahmoud Shoolizadeh, that has participated in several international film festivals and has won two awards. Although the film is based in the city of Jacksonville, Florida, it was filmed in St. Mary's, Georgia, as well as in Jacksonville. Several local newspapers have published articles and discussed this film in detail.<ref>{{Cite web |url=http://jacksonville.com/news/georgia/2014-04-20/story/movie-producers-are-rolling-camera-ready-camden-county-thanks-coastal |title=Movie producers are rolling in camera ready" Camden County thanks to Coastal Georgia Film Alliance |access-date=2014-11-27 |archive-date=2015-09-30 |archive-url=https://web.archive.org/web/20150930014557/http://jacksonville.com/news/georgia/2014-04-20/story/movie-producers-are-rolling-camera-ready-camden-county-thanks-coastal |url-status=dead }}</ref>

Plot
The short fiction film The Debt'', as seen by the official trailer available on YouTube, is about a combat veteran whose life is falling apart unexpectedly faces her past, and it is not what she thought.

"Lisa's family appears normal and happy. Her loving husband dotes on her and their beautiful daughter. But in her heart lies a secret that eats at her soul like a malignant cancer, causing irritability and unpredictable outbursts that make her a stranger in her own home. Shame and guilt from wartime experiences fill every waking and sleeping moment. Desperate, she decides to take an extreme action to escape her past. Instead, she comes face-to-face with a surprising truth."

Awards and nominations

 Nominated for Best Directing at the "Universal Film Festival", Kansas City, Missouri, USA, August 2019
 Nominated for Best Drama at the "Universal Film Festival", Kansas City, Missouri, USA, August 2019
 Nominated for Best Film at the "Universal Film Festival", Kansas City, Missouri, USA, August 2019
 Nominated for Best Film at the "Indie Best Film Festival", Santa Monica, California, USA, July 2018
 Award for Best Film at the 15th "Moondance International Film Festival, Sep 2014", Boulder, Colorado, USA 
 Award for Best Female Actor at the 15th "Moondance International Film Festival Sep 2014", Boulder, Colorado, USA 
 Award for Best 10th Voyage Studios at the "Flagler International Film Festival", Palm Coast, Florida, USA, January 2015
 Award for Best Supporting Actress at the North Carolina "First in Aviation" State's Global Film Festival, January 2015, North Carolina, USA
 Award for Best Child Actor at the North Carolina "First in Aviation" State's Global Film Festiva, January 2015, North Carolina, USA
 Nominated for Best Drama at the "Flagler International Film Festival", Palm Coast, Florida, USA, January 2015
 Nominated for Best Film in Florida at the "Flagler International Film Festival", Palm Coast, Florida, USA, January 2015
 Nominated for Best Ensemble Cast at the "Flagler International Film Festival", Palm Coast, Florida, USA, January 2015

Festival participation
 Universal Film Festival, Kansas City, Missouri, USA, August 2019 
 Indie Best Film Festival, Santa Monica, California, USA, July 2018
 WideScreen Film & Music Video Festival, for the Trailer of the film, Florida, Miami, USA, March 2016
 Gwinnett Center International Film Festival, July–August 2015, Duluth, Georgia, USA
 Rendezvous Film Festival, June 2015, Amelia Island, Florida, USA
 The People's Film Festival, May 2015, New York, USA
 WideScreen Film & Music Video Festival, February 2015, Miami, Florida, USA
 North Carolina "First in Aviation" State's Global Film Festival
 Jumpthecut International Film Festival, Jan 2015, Singapore
 Flagler International Film Festival, Jan 2015, Palm Coast, Florida, USA
 Borrego Springs International Film Festival, Jan 2015, Borrego Springs, California, USA
 Atlas & Aeris International Magazine of Independent Film, Jan 2015, New York City, USA 
 Oregon Underground International Film Festival, Nov 2014, Oregon, USA
 CineFest Global International Film Festival, Oct 2014, USA, shown in 10 Cities in USA and 10 Countries 
 Bayou City Inspirational Film Festival, Oct 2014, Houston, TX, USA 
 15th Moondance International Film Festival, Sep 2014, Boulder, Colorado, USA 
 Mount Vernon International Film Festival, Sep 2014, New York, USA.
 Golden Orchid International Film Festival, Sep 2014, State University, Pennsylvania, USA 
 UnderFunded International Film Festival, Sep 2014, Provo, Utah, USA 
 Columbia Gorge International Film Festival, Aug 2014, Vancouver, WA, USA

References

External links 
 
 Award Winning Composer & Sound Designer
 Official Movie Trailer: "The Debt" Official Trailer, Directed by: M.Shoolizadeh, 2014, USA
 Official Festivals and Awards section of the Film's website: The Debt Festivals, Awards

2014 films
2010s English-language films